Three Problems for Solar Pons is a collection of detective fiction short stories by American writer August Derleth.  It was released in 1952 by Mycroft & Moran in an edition of 996 copies.  It was the third collection of Derleth's Solar Pons stories which are pastiches of the Sherlock Holmes tales of Arthur Conan Doyle.  The book was intended as an interim collection and all the stories are reprinted in The Return of Solar Pons.  Because of the low print run, it is the scarcest Mycroft & Moran book.

The dustjacket was by artist Ronald Clyne.

Contents

Three Problems for Solar Pons contains the following tales:

 "A Note for the Aficionado"
 "The Adventure of the Rydberg Numbers"
 "The Adventure of the Remarkable Worm"
 "The Adventure of the Camberwell Beauty"

Sources

1952 short story collections
Mystery short story collections
Solar Pons
Books by August Derleth